Biodiversity banking, also known as biodiversity trading or conservation banking, biodiversity mitigation banks, compensatory habitat, set-asides, biodiversity offsets, are conservation activities that compensate for the loss of biodiversity with the goal of biodiversity maintenance through a framework which allows biodiversity to be reliably measured, and market based solutions applied to improving biodiversity. Biodiversity banking provides a means to place a monetary value on ecosystem services. Typically this involves land protection, restoration, an/or enhancement. Biodiversity banking is often applied so that there is no "net loss of a particular biodiversity feature." According to the International Union for Conservation of Nature, by 2004, interest in voluntary biodiversity offsets was growing in the United States, Brazil, Australia, Canada and the EU. Experience suggested that industry, governments, local communities and conservation groups all benefit from biodiversity offsets or biodiversity banking.

Terminology
According to the IUCN, "[b]iodiversity offsets are designed to compensate for residual environmental damage caused by development after avoidance, minimization, and mitigation of environmental impacts have been considered and implemented. The goal of offsets is to compensate for the loss of biodiversity at one location with conservation
gains elsewhere."

In practice
In practice, biodiversity banks rely on existing governmental laws, which forbid companies or individuals of buying up land in an area that houses, say a critically endangered species. An exception is also in place in this governmental law which allows companies to buy up the land nonetheless, if they also buy a certain amount of compensation credits with a certified biodiversity bank. These credits, which represent a significant extra cost to the company, are then used to provide revenue for the biodiversity bank, but the revenue derived thereof is also used by the bank to buy up conservation area elsewhere for the endangered species.

United States
In the United States a "mitigation banking" process applies to impacts on wetlands. It requires that developers firstly avoid harm to wetlands, but if harm is considered unavoidable, then  wetland habitat of similar function and values must be "protected, enhanced or restored" to compensate for those that will be damaged. The process comes under the US Clean Water Act 1972, the US Army Corps of Engineers regulations  and the commitment to "no net loss" of wetlands habitat.

Since about 2000, the term "species banking", sometimes called "conservation banking", has applied to impacts on species of special concern, typically those that are listed by state and federal agencies under the U.S. Endangered Species Act or its state-based equivalent.  Similar to wetlands banks, conservation banks are designed as compensation for impacts to listed species or their habitat, ensuring a similar no net loss policy for these biodiversity resources.

Compensation for impacts to a stream riparian zone may also be required in relation to the linear distance of lost stream functions resulting from stream bank structures (e.g., concrete or rip rap), sedimentation, channelization, dredging or similar activities.

Australia
Two biodiversity banking schemes operating in Australia are the New South Wales BioBanking scheme, which commenced in 2008, and the Victorian Native Vegetation Management Framework scheme. Both schemes apply particularly to developers, where biodiversity values will be reduced through land clearing and building development. The framework requires developers to source biodiversity credits through a market mechanism to offset biodiversity loss.

Listed species, critical habitat, wetlands and stream habitat are all components of biodiversity ecosystem services.  Taken collectively, they may be referred to as "biodiversity banks".

Canada
In Alberta, Canada, Alberta Biodiversity Monitoring Institute (ABMI) researchers use the oil sands industry of Alberta as a case study in their paper in which they evaluated the commonly used and costly ecological equivalency-based biodiversity offset in terms of economic and ecological performance with more flexible alternative offset systems. They used ABMI's "empirically derived index of biodiversity intactness to link offsets with losses incurred by development." They evaluated ecologically equivalent areas in regards to vegetation types and regional conservation priorities such as the recovery of the boreal woodland caribou and the Dry Mixedwood natural subregion in the oil sands region. They found that flexible alternative systems like the priority-focused offsetting networks, cost 2-17 times less than the ecological equivalency-based biodiversity offset vegetation cost 2–17 times more than priority-focused networks.

See also 
Biodiversity
Mitigation banking
Conservation in Australia
Environmental issues in Australia
Economics of biodiversity
Ecosystem services
Satoyama
Biodiversity offsetting

References

Further reading

External links
 List of biodiversity banking companies and initiatives
 NSW Department of Environment and Climate Change
 ABC Breakfast Carbon markets to provide lessons for global trade in biodiversity
 ABC Saturday Extra Biodiversity banking part one
 ABC Saturday Extra Biodiversity banking part two
 DEFRA definition and discussion of biodiversity offsetting
 Conservation Banking profile on database of Market Governance Mechanisms

Nature conservation in Australia
Biodiversity